The International Conference on Software Engineering (ICSE), is one of the largest annual software engineering conferences. It has an 'A*' rating in the Rankings of the Computing Research and Education Association of Australasia (CORE) and an 'A1' rating from the Brazilian ministry of education. Furthermore, it is the software engineering conference with the highest Microsoft Academic field rating. The first ICSE conference was in 1975 in Washington DC.

List of Conferences
Past and future ICSE conferences include:

References

External links
 Pointers to ICSE conference websites
 ICSE Steering Committee Information

Software engineering conferences